Joseph Mihal (April 2, 1916 – September 18, 1979) was a professional American football player who played as a tackle in the National Football League (NFL) for two seasons with the Chicago Bears.  He was elected as a starter for the 1939 Chicago College All-Star Game.

Mihal played for the Bears in their 73–0 victory over the Washington Redskins in the 1940 NFL Championship Game. He served in World War II for the United States Army.

References

External links
 
 

1916 births
1979 deaths
American football tackles
Chicago Bears players
Chicago Rockets players
Los Angeles Dons players
Purdue Boilermakers football players
People from Homestead, Pennsylvania
Players of American football from Gary, Indiana
United States Army personnel of World War II